Aitape Airport  is an airfield in Aitape, in the Sandaun Province of Papua New Guinea.
There is another airstrip at Tadji about 10 km to the east, where most flights land.

References

External links
 

Airports in Papua New Guinea
Sandaun Province